Power Patriot is the third studio album by Garage A Trois. It is the first CD with the musician line-up that includes Stanton Moore, Skerik, Mike Dillon and Marco Benevento. It was released October 2009.

Track listing
 "Rescue Spreaders" (Benevento)
 "Fragile" (Benevento)
 "Dory's Day Out" (Dillon)
 "Electric Door Bell Machine" (Dillon, Benevento, Skerik)
 "Power Patriot" (Skerik)
 "Dugout" (Dillon)
 "Fat Redneck Gangster" (Dillon)
 "Purgatory" (Skerik)
 "Germs" (Dillon)
 "Computer Crimes" (Dillon)

Personnel
 Stanton Moore: drums
 Skerik: saxophone
 Mike Dillon: vibraphone
 Marco Benevento: keyboards

References

Garage A Trois albums
2009 albums